Allan Keith (22 February 1889 – 21 November 1953) was a Canadian gymnast. He competed in the men's artistic individual all-around event at the 1908 Summer Olympics.

References

External links
 

1889 births
1953 deaths
Canadian male artistic gymnasts
Olympic gymnasts of Canada
Gymnasts at the 1908 Summer Olympics
Gymnasts from Toronto